Consolidated Bank of Kenya commonly known as Consolidated Bank, is a commercial bank in Nairobi, Kenya, East Africa's largest economy. It is licensed by the Central Bank of Kenya.

Overview
Consolidated Bank is a medium-sized financial services provider in Kenya, focusing on meeting the banking needs of small and medium-sized enterprises in the country. As of December 2017, the Bank's total asset valuation stood at about US$133.6 million (KES: 13.5 billion), with Shareholders' Equity valued at about US$10.5 million (KES: 1.06 billion). As at December 2017, the Bank was rated number 33, by assets, out of 40 licensed banks in Kenya.

History
The Bank was incorporated in 1989, as a result of the merger of the following nine insolvent financial institutions:
 Jimba Credit Corporation Limited
 Union Bank of Kenya Limited
 Kenya Savings and Mortgages Limited
 Estate Finance Company of Kenya Limited
 Estate Building Society
 Business Finance Company Limited
 Citizen Building Society
 Nationwide Finance Company Limited
 Home Savings and Mortgages Limited
Consolidated Bank aims to meet the banking needs of both individuals and institutions. In the beginning, the institution was limited to collecting the debts of the failed legacy financial institutions. However, the Central Bank of Kenya, issued CBKL with a full commercial banking license in 2001.

With decades of banking experience and a special focus on small and medium-sized enterprises, it is in a strong position to help growing businesses unlock their potential and sail through the complexities they may face.

Banking services include current accounts, savings accounts, fixed and call deposits, loan and overdraft facilities, local and overseas money transfer services, and local and international trade finance. The bank is also active on the local inter-bank money market.

Ownership
Consolidated Bank is fully owned by the Government with the majority shareholding in the Bank (85.8%) held by the National Treasury. The remaining shareholding is spread over twenty five (25) parastatals and other quasi government organizations as set out below.

As of December 2018, Consolidated Bank maintains 17 branches in urban areas of Kenya.

See also
 List of banks in Kenya
 Central Bank of Kenya
 Economy of Kenya

References

External links
Consolidated Bank Homepage
KBC: Consolidated Bank Profit jumps

Banks of Kenya
Banks established in 1989
Companies based in Nairobi
Kenyan companies established in 1989